Benda may refer to:

Places and jurisdictions 
 Benda, Albania, a region, and an ancient city, - a former bishopric in Epirus Novus and present Latin Catholic titular see
 Benda, Sirampog, a subdistrict of Sirampog, Central Java, Indonesia
 Benda, Tangerang, a subdistrict of Tangerang, Banten, Indonesia
 Benda, Guinea
 Qulbəndə (Gyul'benda, Gülbəndə, Qulbəndə), a village and municipality in the Agdash Rayon, Azerbaijan
 Benda, Santrampur, in Gujarat, India

Other 
 Benda (surname), for people including composers of Franz Benda's Czech dynasty
 Benda Chamber Orchestra, a Czech amateur music ensemble, named after that musical family
 734 Benda, a minor planet
 Prachum Benda or Pchum Ben, ancestors' day in Cambodia
 Staff Benda Bilili, a group of Congolese street musicians living around the zoo in Kinshasa
 "The Prisoner of Benda", an episode of Futurama